A sheikhdom or sheikdom is a geographical area or a society ruled by a tribal leader known as a sheikh. Sheikhdoms exist almost exclusively within Arab countries, particularly in the Arabian Peninsula (Arab States of the Persian Gulf), with some notable exceptions throughout history (e.g. the Sangage Sheikhdom).

Although some countries are ruled by a sheikh, they are not typically referred to as sheikdoms, but kingdom, emirate, or simply state, and their ruler usually has another royal title such as king or emir.

See also
United Arab Emirates - A federation of seven sheikhdoms
Sheikhdom of Kuwait - Predecessor to the State of Kuwait

References

External links

 Media Use
Asia Times

Monarchy
Islamic states by type